Royal Pains is a medical comedy-drama television series that premiered on USA Network on June 4, 2009.  The series stars Mark Feuerstein as a young doctor who, after being wrongly blamed for an important patient's death, moves to The Hamptons and becomes a reluctant concierge doctor to the rich and famous. A Royal Pains two-hour movie aired on Sunday, December 16, 2012. In November 2014, the network renewed the series for seasons 7 and 8, with each season consisting of eight episodes. The seventh season premiered on June 2, 2015. The eighth and final season began on May 18, 2016, and ended on July 6, 2016.

Series overview

Episodes

Season 1 (2009)

Season 2 (2010–11)

Season 3 (2011–12) 
Royal Pains was renewed for a third season of 16 to 18 episodes on September 27, 2010.  The season has included two guest appearances by Ed Asner, who played the Lawson brothers' grandfather, Ted Roth.  The season also saw the return of Libby (Meredith Hagner) and Jack (Tom Cavanagh).  Additional guest stars included Shiri Appleby, Julie Benz, Joanna Gleason, Tony Hale, Greg Jennings, David Rasche,  and Molly Sims.  The first half of the season, consisting of 10 episodes, concluded on August 31, 2011, while the remaining six episodes began airing on January 18, 2012.

Season 4 (2012) 
The series was renewed for a sixteen-episode fourth season by USA Network on September 15, 2011.  Campbell Scott and Brooke D'Orsay, who play Boris Kuester von Jurgens-Ratenicz and Paige Collins, respectively, joined the main cast.  Henry Winkler returned to the series as Eddie R. Lawson, Hank and Evan's father.  Ben Shenkman appeared in multiple episodes as Dr. Jeremiah Sacani, Hank's replacement, and then co-doctor, at HankMed. Timothée Chalamet appeared in multiple episodes as Jill's nephew, Luke.  Donal Logue appeared in two episodes as Ernie, Jill's brother.  Kat Foster appeared in several episodes as Harper Cummings, a doctor Hank is set up with by one of his patients.  The first episode was written by series creator Andrew Lenchewski.  Alexa Vega appeared in the second episode of the season. Judy Greer appeared in one episode as Veronica Sullivan, a matchmaker who is treated by Hank.

Season 5 (2013) 
Season five of Royal Pains premiered on June 12, 2013. Ben Shenkman (Dr. Jeremiah Sacani) was added as a series regular this season. Frances Conroy guests stars in a multi-episode arc as a wealthy socialite who attempts to prevent HankMed operating in her neighborhood. Laura Benanti appears in multiple episodes as Shelby Shackelford, the VP of Acquisitions of Symphony Health Care Systems, a health care company that buys Hamptons Heritage and attempts to acquire HankMed. Callum Blue joins as a recurring role as Boris' cousin and plays a pivotal part in Boris' story arc. Danny Pudi and Claire Coffee appear in episode four. Jenna Elfman appears in episode eleven as Lacy, a reformed party girl. Henry Winkler reprises his role of Eddie Lawson this season.

Season 6 (2014) 
On September 25, 2012, Royal Pains was renewed for two additional seasons (seasons 5 and 6). The additional seasons will contain 26 episodes in total, 13 episodes per season. Season six premiered on June 10, 2014. Guest stars for season six include, Gillian Alexy as Charlotte, a woman Hank meets while in Europe; Patrick Breen as Bob, a couples counselor who helps Paige and Evan; Jerry Davidson as Ray Mazzarino, a new HankMed patient who decides to go into business with Evan; Martha Higareda as Viviana, a bartender at a local bar which Jeremiah frequents; and Natalie Hall as Hope, a burlesque dancer who turns to Jeremiah for help when she begins experiencing pain during her act. Cheyenne Jackson guest stars as Sam, a perfumery owner who begins to lose his sense of smell. Khloe Kardashian and Scott Disick appear as themselves in the season finale.

Season 7 (2015)

Season 8 (2016)

Ratings

References 

Lists of American comedy-drama television series episodes